Scott Edgar Mellanby (born June 11, 1966) is a Canadian former professional ice hockey player, coach, and executive. He primarily played right wing throughout his NHL career, on occasion shifting over to the left side. He is the son of former Hockey Night in Canada producer Ralph Mellanby.

Playing career

Amateur
As a youth, Mellanby played in the 1979 Quebec International Pee-Wee Hockey Tournament with a minor ice hockey team from Mississauga.

Collegiate
Mellanby was selected 27th overall by the Philadelphia Flyers in the 1984 NHL Entry Draft. After being drafted, Mellanby went to the University of Wisconsin–Madison where he played for two seasons. While there, he also competed with Canada's National Hockey Team. He finished his collegiate career with 35 goals and 82 points in 72 games.

Professional
After his second season in the WCHA was finished, he promptly played his first two NHL games. He made his NHL debut on March 22, 1986 against the New York Rangers. In 1989, Mellanby suffered a serious injury in a barroom brawl when he tried to help a friend and he wound up getting a severe cut from a broken beer bottle on his left arm. The cut sliced four tendons, a nerve and an artery in the arm.

Mellanby would play for Philadelphia until the summer of 1991, when he was traded to the Edmonton Oilers in a 6-player deal that included Jari Kurri going to Philadelphia (though Kurri was traded to the Los Angeles Kings the same day). 

Mellanby was left unprotected by the Edmonton Oilers in the 1993 NHL Expansion Draft, allowing him to be claimed by the new Florida Panthers. This was the team where Mellanby would have his best years. In fact he became a fan favorite in Florida when he killed a rat with his hockey stick in the team dressing room, spawning the "rat trick" craze, where fans would litter the ice with thousands of plastic rats after each Panthers goal. He also scored the Panthers' first ever goal in franchise history on October 9, 1993 and played in the 1996 All-Star game.

Mellanby was traded to the St. Louis Blues in February 2001, and the move revitalized his career. He scored 57 points during the 2002–03 season, his highest total since 1996. Mellanby then signed as a free agent with the Atlanta Thrashers in the summer of 2004 and he re-signed with Atlanta for the 2006–07 season. On November 23, 2006, he was suspended one game for a fight between the Thrashers and the Washington Capitals.

Retirement
Mellanby announced his retirement on 24 April 2007, becoming the first player to retire as a Thrashers captain (the four previous Thrashers captains, were either traded or signed elsewhere via free-agency). Mellanby left the game having played the 3rd most NHL games (1431) without a Stanley Cup victory, only behind Phil Housley (1495) and Mike Gartner (1432). The closest Mellanby came to the cup was when his Philadelphia Flyers lost to Edmonton in the 1987 Stanley Cup Finals, 4 games to 3.

Following retirement, Mellanby worked for three years in the Vancouver Canucks organization as a special consultant to general manager Mike Gillis and the hockey operations department. Mellanby then spent two years as an assistant coach with the St. Louis Blues before stepping down following the 2011–12 season to pursue other opportunities in hockey.

On May 28, 2012, Mellanby was hired by the Montreal Canadiens as Director of Player Personnel and became an assistant GM on July 30, 2014. On November 27, 2021 the club announced that Mellanby had resigned.

Personal life
Mellanby and his wife, Susan have a daughter, Courtney, and two sons Carter and Nicholas. Mellanby also is involved in many autism-related causes as his son Carter is autistic. Along with fellow NHLers Olaf Kolzig and Byron Dafoe, Mellanby is a founder of Athletes Against Autism.

Records
Most assists in a game by a Florida Panther, (4 – shared with Ray Whitney)
Most power play goals in a game, (4)

Career statistics

Regular season and playoffs

International

See also
Captain
List of NHL players with 1000 games played
List of NHL players with 2000 career penalty minutes

References

External links

 

1966 births
Living people
Anglophone Quebec people
Atlanta Thrashers captains
Atlanta Thrashers players
Autism activists
Canadian ice hockey right wingers
Edmonton Oilers players
Florida Panthers players
Ice hockey people from Montreal
Montreal Canadiens executives
National Hockey League All-Stars
Philadelphia Flyers draft picks
Philadelphia Flyers players
St. Louis Blues coaches
St. Louis Blues players
Vancouver Canucks scouts
Wisconsin Badgers men's ice hockey players
Canadian ice hockey coaches